Linea Søgaard-Lidell (born 30 March 1987) is a Danish politician.

Political career 
She stood in the 2019 European Parliament election in Denmark. She was placed 4th on the Venstre list and won 24,153 personal votes, and so was not elected immediately but secured a seat among the British seats that were redistributed after the UK left the European Union, which she took after Brexit. She sat with the Renew Europe group.

In November 2022, she resigned from the European Parliament after being elected to the Folketing in the 2022 general election and was replaced by Bergur Løkke Rasmussen.

References 

Living people
1987 births
21st-century Danish politicians
21st-century Danish women politicians
MEPs for Denmark 2019–2024
Venstre (Denmark) MEPs
21st-century women MEPs for Denmark
Members of the Folketing 2022–2026
Women members of the Folketing

Aarhus University alumni
Maastricht University alumni
Politicians from Aarhus